Mãi Yêu Người Thôi is the fourth studio album by Vietnamese American singer Lâm Nhật Tiến, which was released on 1 January 2001 in the United States under the music label Asia Entertainment Inc. after he had received the "Best Asia Artist of the year 2000" Award. With production by Thy Vân, Trúc Hồ, and Lâm Nhật Tiến, the album is considered the peak of Lâm's career.

Music and production 
This album contains 9 tracks in Vietnamese and 1 track in English, including the songs: "Đã Qua Thời Mong Chờ" (one of the notable songs of Vietnamese overseas music in the late 1990s, written by Trúc Hồ and Trầm Tử Thiêng), "Hà Nội Mùa Vắng Những Cơn Mưa", "Đi Về Nơi Xa" (two famous songs of Vietnamese music in the late 1990s), "Làm Sao Anh Nói" (a Vietnamese version of "How Could I" by Marc Anthony), and "You Make Me Feel" (a world popular song by the German band, Bonfire). The title track  and "Dẫu Có Biết Trước" written by Trúc Hồ, also became the big hits of Lâm in the year 2001.

Track listing

References 

2001 albums
Lâm Nhật Tiến albums